The canton of Annecy-4 (before March 2020: canton of Seynod) is an administrative division in Eastern France. Since the French canton reorganisation which came into effect in March 2015, the communes of the canton of Annecy-4 are:

Annecy (partly: Cran-Gevrier and Seynod)
La Chapelle-Saint-Maurice
Chavanod 
Duingt
Entrevernes
Leschaux
Montagny-les-Lanches
Quintal
Saint-Eustache
Saint-Jorioz

References 

Annecy-4